is a gravity dam located in Gifu Prefecture in Japan. The dam is used for power production. The catchment area of the dam is 507 km2. The dam impounds about 10  ha of land when full and can store 340 thousand cubic meters of water. The construction of the dam was started on 1939 and completed in 1942.

References

Dams in Gifu Prefecture
1942 establishments in Japan